Linepithema gallardoi is a species of ant in the genus Linepithema. Described by Juan Brèthes in 1914, the species is endemic to South America.

References

Dolichoderinae
Hymenoptera of North America
Insects described in 1914
Taxa named by Juan Brèthes